John Henry Fisher (April 3, 1855 – December 1, 1933) was an Ontario merchant and political figure. He represented Brant North in the Legislative Assembly of Ontario from 1905 to 1911 and Brant in the House of Commons of Canada from 1911 to 1917 as a Conservative member. He also served in the Senate of Canada from 1917 until his death.

He was born in Paris, Canada West, the son of Robert Fisher, who came to Upper Canada from Devonshire, England. In 1883, Fisher married Jessie D. Martin. He was reeve of Paris in 1885 and 1886, county warden in 1886 and also served five years as Paris' mayor. He ran unsuccessfully against Daniel Burt in 1898 and 1902 before defeating Burt in 1905.

Fisher was appointed Honorary Colonel of the 25th Brant Dragoons after the First World War.

Electoral record

References

External links 

History of the county of Brant, FD Reville (1920)

1855 births
1933 deaths
Conservative Party of Canada (1867–1942) MPs
Canadian senators from Ontario
Mayors of places in Ontario
Members of the House of Commons of Canada from Ontario
Progressive Conservative Party of Ontario MPPs
People from the County of Brant